Laurent Servais Duriau, known as Servais (April 5, 1701 – July 15, 1775), was a Cistercian monk from the Abbey of Val-Dieu. An encyclopedist, he catalogued vast numbers of engravings.

Biographical Information 
He was the fourth child of the manager of the episcopal palace at Liège, Laurent Duriau, and Anne-Jeanne Hanrion. They were a wealthy urban family. On August 23, 1722, Servais became a Cistercian monk at Val-Dieu. At that time, the abbey was enjoying an economical, cultural, and spiritual high. Duriau was ordained a priest in 1725, served as confessor for two nuns' abbeys, one was Orienten Abbey (Abbaye d'Orienten) and the other Burtscheid near Aachen. In 1752, he was sub-prior at Val-Dieu and remained so for 23 years. In 1772, he celebrated his 50th anniversary of taking monastic vows. 

In addition to his monastic duties, Servais Duriau nurtured his encyclopedic passion by dedicating untold hours to the imposing volumes in his collection, each containing between 300 and 2000 patiently annotated engravings. Servais Duriau died in 1775.

Works 
His 32 volumes, of which 27 are known today, include more than 20,000 engravings from the years around 1500 to 1775. They originated in France, the Netherlands, and Germany. 19 of the volumes are kept today in at the Cathedral of Liège in the Duriau Collection; seven volumes have been identified in private collections, and five others are reputed to be lost. Parts of the collection were hidden, sold and scattered between 1796 and 1840, then finally bought back to Val-Dieu Abbey. 

The Duriau collection is the subject of frequent study, as it provides a view of the world during the Enlightenment. A major restoration, financed by the King Baudouin Foundation, is currently being completed. The rich iconography of the collection can be seen in the 2007 book devoted to the "Walloon Print Heritage".

Volumes and their titles 
1. Old Testament

2. New Testament

3. Popes

4. Heresies

5. Roman emperors, persecution of Christians, martyrs, saints

6. Cardinals, archbishops, doctors and priests in France and the Netherlands

7. Archbishops, bishops and other clergy in the Holy Roman Empire, as well as the bishops of Liège

8. Anachoretes, Benedictines, Camaldolese, Grammontensians, Carthusians and Cistercians

9. Premonstratensians, Canons, Fontevrault, Coelestines, Trinitarian Order, Saint-Antoine, Teutonic Order, Carmelites, Dominicans and Augustinians

10. Franciscans, Pauline Fathers, Jesuits, Oratorians, Theatines, Regular Clerics, Life of St. Birgitta of Sweden

11. miscellaneous content concerning religious orders

12. Electors, archbishops, bishops, princes in the Empire, in England, in Northern Europe and in Holland (alphabetical)

13. Kings and queens, princes in France, Spain, Naples, Sicily, Savoy, Lorraine and others in Italy

14. Dukes and duchesses of Brabant and the Netherlands, generals, admirals, governors and other leaders

15. Ambassadors, famous men and women

16. continuation of 15

17. Artists, painters, engravers, architects, iconography of Anthonis van Dyck

18. Fables of Michel de Marolles, Aesop, Phaedrus, and La Fontaine 1753.

19. Paintings (continued) with many models from the drawing lesson 1755

20. Riddles, allusions, moralia, symbols, hieroglyphics, 1756

21. Spain, Naples, Milan, Florence, Italy, Roman antiquity, 1770

22. Sardinia, Savoy, Switzerland, Genoa, Italy, Portugal, Venice, 1771

23. Cities in Germany, Poland, Sweden, Denmark, Russia, siege of Vienna, 1735

24. Cities in Hungary, Turkey, Asia, Africa, America, with emperors, kings, 1739

25. France: cities, castles, mazes, amusement parks and curiosities, 1752

26. Towns, castles, abbeys in Hainault, Flanders, Brabant, Limburg, Luxembourg, 1763

27. Towns in Holland and England, 1763

28. The wargod Mars: drawings, coats of arms, 1753

29. Craftsmen, actors, beggars, grotesques and many verses, foreign exchange, aphorisms and maxims

30. Animals, hunting, flowers, fruit, birds, butterflies, landscapes

31. Religious motifs, including some by Rubens

32. Secular motifs

Bibliography 
Brouette, Émile / Dimier, Anselme / Manning, Eugène: Dictionnaire des auteurs cisterciens (Documentation cistercienne 16.1) (Rochefort: Abbaye Notre-Dame de St-Remy, 1975, vol. 1, p. 222.

References

Weblinks 

 The Duriau collection on Dicothe homepage

Belgian Cistercians
Encyclopedists
Cistercian literature
1701 births
1775 deaths